Peter James McMurrich (12 May 1886 – 20 February 1960) was an Australian rules footballer who played with Geelong in the Victorian Football League (VFL).

Notes

External links 

1886 births
1960 deaths
Australian rules footballers from Victoria (Australia)
Geelong Football Club players
Barwon Football Club players